Hakea pandanicarpa is a shrub species in the family Proteaceae. It is endemic to south-west Western Australia.

Description
White-cream to greenish flowers appear on racemes with 4-14 flowers along the length of the stalk. Branchlets and young leaves are closely pressed to the stem and covered in short soft hairs.

Taxonomy and naming
The species was first formally described in 1830 by botanist Robert Brown who observed the species growing between Cape Arid and Lucky Bay. Brown's description was published in Supplementum primum prodromi florae Novae Hollandiae. The specific epithet (pandanicarpa) means "Pandanus-fruited", referring to the warty fruit of this species.

Two subspecies are accepted by the Australian Plant Census:
Hakea pandanicarpa subsp. crassifolia (Meisn.) R.M.Barker. Subspecies crassifolia can be identified by the fruit mainly having a smooth surface at a young age, becoming rougher as it ages but still comparatively smooth.  The external pattern on the fruit of subsp. crassifolia resembles that of "drying mud in a clay pan". This subspecies grows from Corrigin to Albany and east to Ravensthorpe.
Hakea pandanicarpa R.Br. subsp. pandanicarpa. Subspecies pandanicarpa has prominent raised corky pyramid-shaped projections on the fruit from a young age. Subspecies  pandanicarpa has a more easterly distribution than subsp. crassifolia. It grows from the Fitzgerald River National Park east to Israelite Bay.

Distribution and habitat
Hakea pandanicarpa grows  from the Stirling Ranges to Israelite Bay on sand plain with low shrubland, heath and occasionally mallee.

References

pandanicarpa
Eudicots of Western Australia
Taxa named by Robert Brown (botanist, born 1773)
Plants described in 1830